The Transcaucasian chub ('Squalius turcicus'') is a species of ray-finned fish in the family Cyprinidae. It is found in Turkey.

References

Squalius
Fish described in 1865
Taxa named by Filippo De Filippi